The Weston-Worle Ridge is a range of three hills just north of Weston-super-Mare. Going from west to east, these hills are Worlebury Hill, Milton Hill, and Worle Hill.

References 

Hills of Somerset
Weston-super-Mare